Sava IV was the Serbian Patriarch, the primate of the Serbian Orthodox Church in the period of 1354–1375. He became the second patriarch during the reign of Serbian emperor Stefan Dušan (r. 1331–55), succeeding Patriarch Joanikije II (s. 1346–1354, Serbian Archbishop since 1338). He continued his office into the reign of Stefan Uroš V (r. 1355–71).

The hegumen of Hilandar, he succeeded as the Serbian Patriarch after the death of Joanikije II (3 September 1354), being appointed after the assembly in Serres convoked by Emperor Dušan on 29 November 1354. During his office, the Serbian Church worked to reconcile with the Patriarchate of Constantinople, relations having deteriorated following Serbian expansion. Of six chrysobulls of emperors Dušan and Uroš V, Sava IV is only called the Patriarch of Greeks in one, that to Arhiljevica dated 14 August 1354. How Sava IV held towards the started reconcilement process is unknown. He died on 29 April 1375, and was buried in the Church of St. Demetrius in Peć. The reconcilement came the same year after his death, during the reign of Prince Lazar of Serbia, owing to diplomacy in which Isaija the Monk was instrumental. In the hagiography of Sava IV, Stefan Dušan's coronation is condemned.

References

Sources

1375 deaths
Patriarchs of the Serbian Orthodox Church
People of the Serbian Empire
14th-century births
14th-century Eastern Orthodox bishops
Medieval Serbian Orthodox clergy